The 35th National Film Awards, presented by Directorate of Film Festivals, the organisation set up by Ministry of Information and Broadcasting, India to felicitate the best of Indian Cinema released in the year 1987. Ceremony took place in April 1988 and awards were given by then President of India, R. Venkataraman.

Starting with 35th National Film Awards, National Film Award for Best Direction for Feature films section is awarded with Swarna Kamal (Golden Lotus). For Non-feature films section, two new awards were instituted and awarded with Rajat Kamal (Silver Lotus) namely, Best Educational / Motivational Film and Best Short Fiction Film.

Awards 

Awards were divided into feature films, non-feature films and books written on Indian cinema.

Lifetime Achievement Award

Feature films 

Feature films were awarded at All India as well as regional level. For 35th National Film Awards, an Assamese film, Halodhia Choraye Baodhan Khai won the National Film Award for Best Feature Film and a Malayalam film, Anantaram along with a Tamil film, Nayakan and a Hindi film, Tamas won the maximum number of awards (3). Following were the awards given in each category:

Juries 

A committee headed by Shyam Benegal was appointed to evaluate the feature films awards. Following were the jury members:

 Jury Members
 Shyam Benegal (Chairperson)Abdul MajidAmita MalikSowcar JanakiJaya BachchanNachiket PatwardhanB. S. NarayanaPavithranSadhu MeherSalil ChowdhuryShaji N. KarunU. S. Vadiraj

All India Award 

Following were the awards given:

Golden Lotus Award 

Official Name: Swarna Kamal

All the awardees are awarded with 'Golden Lotus Award (Swarna Kamal)', a certificate and cash prize.

Silver Lotus Award 

Official Name: Rajat Kamal

All the awardees are awarded with 'Silver Lotus Award (Rajat Kamal)', a certificate and cash prize.

Regional Awards 

The award is given to best film in the regional languages in India.

Non-Feature Films 

Short Films made in any Indian language and certified by the Central Board of Film Certification as a documentary/newsreel/fiction are eligible for non-feature film section.

Juries 

A committee headed by Buddhadeb Dasgupta was appointed to evaluate the non-feature films awards. Following were the jury members:

 Jury Members
 Buddhadeb Dasgupta (Chairperson)K. K. KapilN. LakshminarayanK. ViswanathRam Mohan

Golden Lotus Award 

Official Name: Swarna Kamal

All the awardees are awarded with 'Golden Lotus Award (Swarna Kamal)', a certificate and cash prize.

Silver Lotus Award 

Official Name: Rajat Kamal

All the awardees are awarded with 'Silver Lotus Award (Rajat Kamal)' and cash prize.

Best Writing on Cinema 

The awards aim at encouraging study and appreciation of cinema as an art form and dissemination of information and critical appreciation of this art-form through publication of books, articles, reviews etc.

Juries 

A committee headed by Sunil Ganguly was appointed to evaluate the writing on Indian cinema. Following were the jury members:

 Jury Members
 Sunil Ganguly (Chairperson)Manarcad MathewK. L. Nandan

Silver Lotus Award 
Official Name: Rajat Kamal

All the awardees are awarded with 'Silver Lotus Award (Rajat Kamal)' and cash prize.

Awards not given 

Following were the awards not given as no film was found to be suitable for the award:

 Second Best Feature Film
 Best Feature Film in English
 Best Film on Family Welfare
 Best Feature Film in Manipuri
 Best Feature Film in Punjabi
 Best Feature Film in Telugu
 Best Non-feature Film on Family Welfare
 Best Promotional Film

References

External links 
 National Film Awards Archives
 Official Page for Directorate of Film Festivals, India

National Film Awards (India) ceremonies
1988 Indian film awards